Tulga or Tulca (living 642) was Visigothic King of Hispania, Septimania and Galicia from 640 to 642, if his father died in December 640, as some sources state. Other sources have his rule beginning as early as 639 or ending as early as 641. He came after his father Chintila in another vain attempt to establish dynastic kingship.

Biography
In 642, Chindasuinth, a Gothic warlord, who may have been as old as 79, commenced a rebellion. He had command of the frontier with the Basques. He saw the crown's weakness, and a convention of nobles (landholding Goths) and other Gothic inhabitants at Pampalica (probably modern Pampliega) proclaimed him king without the support of the church.

According to Sigebert of Gembloux, the rebel deposed Tulga in Toledo and tonsured him, sending him to live out his days in a monastery, since monks were ineligible for the elective throne. However, Saint Ildephonsus of Toledo says that the rebellion failed without the church's support and Chindasuinth succeeded only on the death of Tulga. Modern historians consider it is impossible to discern the truth.

Sources
 El Libro de La Genealogía de Los Reyes de España 
 Alonso de Cartagena, Bonifacio Palacios Martín, Biblioteca Nacional (Spain), Faustino Menéndez Pidal de Navascués. Contribuidores Bonifacio Palacios Martín, Biblioteca Nacional 
Editor Scriptorium, 1995 
, 
 Roger Collins, Early medieval Spain: unity in diversity, 400-1000 (New York: Palgrave Macmillan, 1995) , 9780312126629

7th-century Visigothic monarchs